Ouillen is a town and commune in Souk Ahras Province in north-eastern Algeria.

Settlements

 Aïn Battouma
 Kordina
 Aïn Djenane
 Aïn El Mora
 Aïn Messaouda
 Aïn Safra Remila
 Aïn Tirtri
 Aïn Youcif
 Aïn Zrad
 Berrichi
 Boukebch 
 Boulebch
 Bouzaroura
 Dhissa
 Derdara
 Djelida
 Draa Safir
 Etarfaya
 El Battoun
 El Ksor
 El Luiza
 El Mekimen
 Ghoumriane
 Hamman Tassa
 Henchir El Ouachaï
 Khenguet Zaouch
 Ras El Kef
 Sidi Khachine
 Takouka

References

Communes of Souk Ahras Province